Camaiú River is a tributary of the Sucunduri River in the Amazonas state in north-western Brazil.

The river flows through the  Acari National Park created by president Dilma Rousseff in 2016 in the last week before her provisional removal from office.

See also
List of rivers of Amazonas

References

Brazilian Ministry of Transport

Rivers of Amazonas (Brazilian state)